Giuseppe Zanata (1643–1720) was an Italian painter of the Baroque period, active mainly in Lombardy.

He was born in Miasino in the Province of Novara, in Piedmont. He was active in Milan and in the Riviera del Cusio. In the Basilica di San Giulio in Orta San Giulio, he painted a canvas of Visit of the Praetor Audenzio to San Giulio. He trained with Carlo Francesco Nuvolone.

References

1643 births
1720 deaths
17th-century Italian painters
Italian male painters
18th-century Italian painters
Painters from Milan
Italian Baroque painters
18th-century Italian male artists